Hallur Hansson (born 8 July 1992) is a Faroese professional footballer who plays as a midfielder for KR Reykjavík.

Starting his professional career in Scotland as part of Aberdeen, he moved to Denmark to play for AaB from 2012 until 31 January 2014. The first half-year he was on loan from HB Tórshavn, but on 29 January 2013 he signed an 18-month deal with AaB. He then played two and a half years for Vendsyssel FF. After impressing there, he was signed by AC Horsens.

He is a member of the squad of the Faroe Islands national team, having previously played for the Faroe Islands U21, U19, the U17, and U15.

Club career
Hansson played for some years for the football club in Vágur, Suðuroy; the club's name was formerly VB Vágur, in 2005 they merged with Sumba Football Club and was called VB/Sumba, who changed their name in 2010 to FC Suðuroy. Hansson lived in Vágur for some years with his family at that time, but later they moved to Tórshavn and he began to play for HB Tórshavn. It was in 2008 while he played for HB Tórshavn's youth team and some matches for the second best division, that he signed a two-year deal with Aberdeen in Scotland together with Gilli Sørensen from Tvøroyri, who also played for HB Tórshavn at that time. Hansson and Sørensen were spotted by Aberdeen at the Aberdeen International Football Festival in 2006. Hallur Hansson played on the U17 Faroe Islands team which participated at the Aberdeen International Football Festival 2007. Hansson's team won the football competition in Aberdeen.
In May 2010, both Faroese players (Hansson and Sørensen) extended their contracts with the club. Hansson made his debut for Aberdeen in the Scottish Premier League on 27 November 2010. Aberdeen lost 2–0 in their away match against Kilmarnock.

On 29 January 2013, he signed a one-and-a-half-year deal with Danish Superliga club AaB after playing for the club for a half-year on loan from HB Tórshavn. He has made six appearances for AaB's Superliga team. On 31 January 2014, AaB announced that they no longer had a contract with Hansson. In February 2014, he made a contract with the Faroese club Víkingur Gøta. He made an immediate impact with his new club and would go on to score the only goal of the game in the final of the 2014 Faroe Islands Cup against former club HB.

Following the 2014 season, he signed for Danish club Vendsyssel FF.

On 17 June 2016, Hansson signed a two-year contract with Danish Superliga club AC Horsens. After five years in Horsens, Hansson's contract was terminated by mutual agreement on 24 July 2021.

After a spell at Vejle, Hansson moved to KR Reykjavík for the 2022 season.

International career
Hansson went to Aberdeen in Scotland in the summer of 2007 with the U17 Faroe Islands team to play in the Aberdeen International Football Festival. Hansson and his team won the competition; it was the first time that the Faroe Islands U17 won this competition.

Hansson played for the Faroe Islands U19 against Croatia U19 on 7 October 2010. The result was 2–2. He scored the second goal for the Faroe Islands after 82 minutes.

Senior team
Hansson made his debut for the Faroe Islands national team in a friendly loss to Iceland on 15 August 2012. His performance earned him a starting place for the team's first 2014 FIFA World Cup qualification match, a 3–0 defeat to Germany in Hannover.

On 11 October 2013, Hansson scored his first international goal in a 1–1 draw with Kazakhstan in World Cup qualification. On 13 June 2015, he scored the Faroes' opening goal in a 2–1 win over former European champions Greece.

Career statistics
Scores and results list Faroe Islands' goal tally first, score column indicates score after each Hansson goal.

Honours
Víkingur Gøta
Faroe Islands Cup: 2014

Individual
Effodeildin Best Midfielder: 2012
Effodeildin Team of the Season: 2012

References

External links
 UEFA.com, Hallur Hansson's profile
 HB.fo
 Hallur Hansson's profile on FaroeSoccer.com

1992 births
Living people
Faroese footballers
Association football midfielders
Faroe Islands international footballers
Faroe Islands youth international footballers
Havnar Bóltfelag players
Aberdeen F.C. players
VB Vágur players
AaB Fodbold players
AC Horsens players
Víkingur Gøta players
Vendsyssel FF players
Vejle Boldklub players
Danish Superliga players
Danish 1st Division players
Scottish Premier League players
Faroe Islands Premier League players
Faroese expatriate footballers
Faroese expatriate sportspeople in Scotland
Expatriate footballers in Scotland
Expatriate men's footballers in Denmark